Bessemer, Pennsylvania may refer to:

Bessemer, North Braddock, Allegheny County, Pennsylvania
Bessemer, Lawrence County, Pennsylvania
Bessemer, Westmoreland County, Pennsylvania